is a Japanese tokusatsu television miniseries produced by Tsuburaya Productions, aired in TBS from February 28 to April 29, 1983 on weekdays. The miniseries was made as an adaptation to the popular  and  magazine and manga publications, hence it became the first tokusatsu in Japan to be available exclusively on home video. The show's name was inspired by one of the protagonists of 1975 Ultra Series manga , Melos, but both he and the title character are entirely unrelated to each other.

Synopsis
The  is a tribe similar to the Ultras from Nebula M78. In addition to their devotion for peace and justice, they established the Andro Defense Force as their answer to the Inter-Galactic Defense Force. At that moment, the Gua Army started their conquest for universal domination and sent out their Fighting Bems to wreak havoc in multiple planets.

Characters

Andro Defense Force
The  is an organization formed by the Andro (a race with similar traits to the Ultra Warriors) under Zoffy's advice to maintain peace in outer space. When the Gua Army spread their influence, the team set out to fight the regime and its leaders. Each members wear  combat armor with distinctive colors and weapons. As revealed in Ultra Galaxy Fight, the team had recruited several new members (including Andro Ares), as Andro Melos left his position as a leader to join the Galaxy Rescue Force.

Andro Melos: The titular protagonist in the mini-series, he is the captain of the Andro Defense Force and is known for his green colored armor. The  badge on his armor is an award given by Zoffy himself. In the recent media of Ultra Series, Andro Melos had since left his position to join the Galaxy Rescue Force.
Zoffy adopted the alias Andro Melos to fight against the Gua Army and eventually gave it to Caesar's son , who assumed it and the Andro Melos alias ever since then, including his appearance in the eponymous television series.
: A team member who wears the red-colored Cosmo Tector. He has a companion named , who was killed by Juda of the Gua Army.
: The strongest member of the team, known for his brute strength and orange Cosmo Tector.
: The only female member of the team, her Cosmo Tector is white colored and has a pair of wings. Flor came from a family of royal descendants, hence she is able to conjure the  force field like her family members.

Gua Army
The  is the antagonist of the series, a barbaric empire led by the unseen  and stationed on the similarly named planet. The empire's main agenda is to spread their influence through iron fist and constantly fighting against the Andro Defense Force and Ultra Warriors for standing in their way of conquest. Later in the series, it was revealed that Gua is actually the combined form of the siblings and his creation almost doomed the universe before Melos defeated him with the Grantechtor.
Following their near defeat by the Andro Defense Force, they merged into Gua in the final battle against Melos.
: The army's invasion soldiers, each were under servitude of a Space Devil sibling.
: Massive combat mechas created in the image of past Ultra Monsters. The Space Devil siblings rode each one of them in a fight against the Andro Defense Force.
: A trio of Alien Magma mercenaries based on the similarly named alien from Ultraman Leo.

Voice cast
Andro Melos: 
Andro Wolf: 
Andro Mars: 
Andro Flor: 
Alien Ape "Elpa", : 
Juda: 
Mold: 
Gina: 
: 
: 
Narrator:

Songs
Opening theme

Lyrics: 
Composition: 
Arrangement: 
Artist: , 

Ending theme

Lyrics: Noboru Tani
Composition: Shunsuke Kikuchi
Arrangement: Kōji Yoshimura
Artist: Ichirou Mizuki

Appearance in other media
Ultraman Story (1984): Juda was featured in this movie as the adversary of Father of Ultra and created Grand King to fight against Ultra Brothers. The appearance of Juda was to promote the Andro Melos media as both series and related magazines.
Ultraman X (2015): The Space Devil siblings appear as the antagonist of episodes 13 and 14 during the series' crossover with Ultraman Ginga S.
SSSS.Gridman (2018): Andro Melos appear alongside Hunter Knight Tsurugi and Techtor Gear Zero in a cover for in-universe Uchusen magazine.
Ultraman Taiga (2019): Episodes 13 to 15 of the Voice Drama features original characters Andro Ares and Imbeeza in Taiga's recollection in his past. The two characters pay tribute to the Andro Melos miniseries.
Ultra Galaxy Fight: The Absolute Conspiracy (2020): Andro Melos returned to live action media for the first time since the end of his titular series. Having left the Andro Defense Force to join the Galaxy Rescue Force, he would eventually become part of Zero's Ultra League team to curb Tartarus' nefarious plot.

References

Sources

External links
Andro Melos at Tsuburaya Productions

1983 Japanese television series debuts
Ultra television series